Stephen Bergin (born 1995) is an Irish hurler who plays for Laois Senior Championship club Clough–Ballacolla and at inter-county level with the Laois senior hurling team. He usually lines out at as a left corner-forward.

Honours

Clough/Ballacolla
Laois Senior Hurling Championship (3): 2015, 2020, 2021

Laois
Joe McDonagh Cup (1): 2019

References

External links
Stephen Bergin profile at the Laois GAA website

1995 births
Living people
Clough-Ballacolla hurlers
Laois inter-county hurlers